Metacalymene is a genus of trilobites in the order Phacopida, family Calymenidae. This genus is considered monotypic, containing only the type species:

 Metacalymene baylei Barrande, 1846.

These trilobites were nektobenthic detritivore. They lived in the Silurian period in the Ludlow epoch, from 422.9 ± 1.5 to 418.7 ± 2.8 million years ago.

Distribution
Silurian of the Czech Republic.

References
Biolib
Selenopeltis in the Paleobiology Database
Sepkoski, Jack Sepkoski's Online Genus Database – Trilobita
DJ Siveter – 1979 - Metacalymene Kegel, 1927, a Calymenid Trilobite from the Kopanika Formation (Silurian) of Bohemia

Calymenidae
Silurian trilobites
Trilobites of Europe